Francisco León Mane (born 22 May 1973) is a Spanish racing cyclist. He rode in the 2000 Tour de France.

References

External links
 

1973 births
Living people
Spanish male cyclists
Place of birth missing (living people)
People from Baix Penedès
Sportspeople from the Province of Tarragona
Cyclists from Catalonia
20th-century Spanish people